Singida is a town in central Tanzania. The town is the location of the regional headquarters of Singida Region as well as the district headquarters of Singida Urban District. The region and district are named after the town.

Transport

Road links

Paved Trunk road T3 from Morogoro to the Rwandan border passes through the town. Paved trunk road T14 connects Singida with Babati in Manyara Region. The distance from Singida to Dodoma is 252 km, to Shinyanga 300 km, to Arusha 334 km and to Mwanza 467 km.

Railway links
The Singida branch of the Central Line railway connects Singida with the town of Manyoni, which is on the main line.

Airport
The town is served by the Singida AirStrip near the B141 north west of Singida.

Places of interest
Singida town boasts two places of interests as of 22 July 2018 below as follows;

Lake Singida
This saline lake is just outside of Singida Town. It attracts many birds, like pelicans and flamingos.

Regional Museum
This museum shows artifacts from Singida Region's tribes, like weapons and jewellery. It is located at the Open University of Tanzania.

Population
The 2012 national census estimated the population of Singida Urban District at 150,379.

See also
Singida Region
Singida Urban District
Regions of Tanzania
Districts of Tanzania
Railway stations in Tanzania

Gallery

References

Cities in the Great Rift Valley
Populated places in Singida Region
Regional capitals in Tanzania